The Scandinavian Journal of Work, Environment & Health is a bimonthly peer-reviewed open-access medical journal. It covers research on occupational and environmental health and safety. It is published by the Nordic Association of Occupational Safety and Health. Occasionally the journal publishes supplementary issues. It was established in 1975 and the editors-in-chief are Alex Burdorf (Erasmus University) and Reiner Rugulies (National Research Centre for the Working Environment).

Abstracting and indexing
The journal is abstracted and indexed in Index medicus/MEDLINE/PubMed, Science Citation Index, Biological Abstracts, Social Sciences Citation Index, Current Contents/Social & Behavioral Sciences, Current Contents/Clinical Medicine, BIOSIS Previews, Excerpta Medica, EBSCO databases, Cambridge Scientific Abstracts, and PsycINFO. According to the Journal Citation Reports, the journal has a 2020 impact factor of 5.024.

See also 
 Occupational disease
 Occupational health psychology
 Occupational safety and health
 Organizational psychology

References

External links 
 

Publications established in 1975
Epidemiology journals
Occupational safety and health journals
Bimonthly journals
English-language journals
Academic journals published by learned and professional societies
Environmental health journals
Creative Commons Attribution-licensed journals